Bužim is a town and municipality located in Una-Sana Canton of the Federation of Bosnia and Herzegovina, an entity of Bosnia and Herzegovina. It is situated in the most northwestern Bosnia and Herzegovina.

Geography

Bužim borders Bosanska Krupa to the east, Cazin to the south, Velika Kladuša to the west and north, and finally with the Republic of Croatia to the northeast. Geographically most of the municipality is mountainous. Bužim is about 180–400 meters above sea-level.

Bužim is situated in the North-West of Bosnia, actually in North-West part of Unsko-Sanski canton and it is one of eight municipalities in that canton. It borders on the municipalities of Bosanska Krupa (from East), Cazin (from the Soath), Velika Kladuša (from the West and North) and on the municipality Dvor on the river Una (Republic Croatia from the North-West). Territory of Bužim is mountainous. Cava and Dobro Selo spread in the East. Regional roads Bužim - Bosanska Otoka - Bosanska Krupa, i.e. Bosanska Otoka - Bosanski Novi connect Bužim with Bihać, i.e. Banja Luka. Route to South leads across Konjodor towards Cazin and further towards Bihać, and route to Dvor na Uni leads across Zaradostovo and Bućevci. Route to the West leads through Lubarda- Pašin Brod - Todorovo all the way to Velika Kladuša (in the West). Route Bužim - Varoška Rijeka - Radića Most - Vrnograč – Velika Kladuša leads to Zagreb, i.e. route Radića Most – Bosanska Bojna – Glina – Zagreb.

Municipality of Bužim spreads over 130 km² and it has a population of 18.251.  Population density is 150 inhabitants per km², which puts it in the very top of B&H by this criterion (According to the census population density in  B&H  in 1991 was 80,5 inhabitants per km²).

Actual territory of this municipality consists of 14 Local Communities: Bužim – administrative, economic, cultural, education and urban center  has Secondary school "Hasan Musić" and primary school "12. Septembar", Konjodor – primary school " Suljo Mirvić", Čava – primary school "Mirsad Salkić Džaja", Varoška Rijeka – primary school "Lotos i ljiljan" (lotus and lily), Local Communities Vrhovska, Lubarda, Elkasova Rijeka, Zaradostovo, Bućevci, Mrazovac, Radoč and Brigovi have four-class primary schools. Local communities Bag and Jusufovići have no primary schools. Settlements are situated on 180 – 400 m above sea level. Radoč/630 meters, Ćorkovača/603 meters, Konjodor/476 meters, Lubarda/420 meters, Čajino brdo/352 meters are remarkable for their height above sea level.

History

Before the war, the village of Bužim was officially part of the Bosanska Krupa municipality. In 1996 Bužim became a municipality itself. The town was defended by the Army of the Republic of Bosnia and Herzegovina during the War in Bosnia and Herzegovina. One of the most elite and well known brigades of the Army of the Republic of Bosnia and Herzegovina 505th Brigade comes from Bužim.

Because so many twins have been born in Bužim, there is an effort to declare it the "Town of Twins".

Demographics

Population

Ethnic composition

Economy

Entrepreneurship is a very significant branch of economy which strongly influences the economical development of the municipality in general. The entrepreneurs offer a variety of services thus meeting the requirements of customers.

The shops in Bužim are well supplied with various products which satisfy the needs of customers. The retailers supply their shops with merchandise which is either bought at wholesale stores located in other municipalities or supplied by delivery vehicles. In terms of investments, it has been noticed that several bigger retailers have enlarged their stores thus increasing their offer.

One of the basic problems the tradesmen are faced with is illegal competition, the best indicator of which is a chaotic situation at marketplaces as a result of unprofessional work of the inspections. The implementation of more effective and regular measures accompanied by sanctions imposed on the owners of the marketplaces would have stimulating effects on all firms and taxpayers whose business is in accordance with the legal acts and regulations, thus contributing to making better conditions for the companies who do their businesses in a legal way and thus increase taxation, which is of great importance for the municipality. Moreover, one of the general factors which incite economical development is stimulation of entrepreneurship, which is at a low level.

Hospitality is a branch of the economy that focuses mostly on cooking and serving food and drink. There was little investing in hospitality facilities in 2006. At present, there is only one hotelier who has invested in the building of a hotel. The main problem is actually the illegal competence. The fact that in this field is also necessary a prompter and more efficient work of the municipal inspectors as well as their stronger control of businesses, especially in terms of employment and social and health insurance of employees, because there is a certain number of employees in the municipality who are neither registered nor insured in any way.

The role of self-employment and craftsmanship is very significant for the municipal economy which takes part in overall development. Practically, craftsmanship can be classified as branch of economy which belongs to the tertiary industry, in the sphere of services – personal services, household services and industrial services. Trade has been developing so far without significant stimulation by authorities which could improve its development, so that this branch of economy is not developed as a secondary industry, which results in unbalanced development of certain crafts, like opticians, watchmakers, and shoemakers, which have been scarce in the municipality for a long time. Investing in this industry is insufficient, there is a lack of skilled workers and funds for crediting craftsmanship, given by banks, are burdened with high interest rates.

Agriculture

Structure of the farmland use & farms 

According to the established methodology, farmland is classified into eight categories. The first one is the farmland of the best quality whereas the eighth one is urban areas and barren land. Unfortunately, the real state of farmland is not in accordance with the cadastre data. There is no reliable, systematic register of the public farmland and forms of disposing and using it (e.g. the data on the area, maps etc.).

The farmland ownership structure shows the overbalance of the farmland belonging to private properties (82%) over the state farmland (18%). It has been noticed that more and more farmers lease farmland both in the municipality and the other ones too.

Unplanned and uncontrolled turning of farmland into construction sites, accompanied with growing population results in decrease in farmland area per capita. Small farmland properties render the cultivation of land more complex, which results in low productivity.

The damage to the farmland in Bužim is reflected through many forms of the use of farmland for other purposes like open-pit mining, logging, building etc.

Agricultural sorts 

Corn and wheat have been cultivated so far for personal needs, although there are necessary conditions for these sorts to be more largely cultivated as they are very important for nutrition. The fodder production could also be in a larger scale; it should be planned parallel to the planning of total cattle-breeding production as fodder is considered as the raw material for production of animal derivatives such as meat, milk, and eggs.

Truck farming 

Vegetable growing in small family gardens is the commonest way of truck farming. The total area of such gardens in 2006 amounted to 174 hectares, which is more or less enough to satisfy individual needs for fresh vegetables.

Agricultural Advisory Service makes efforts to find the possibilities to intensify truck farming in greenhouses, which is the most intensive form of vegetable growing. So far there are 11 greenhouses the total area of which is 1100 sq meters. The average production of tomatoes and peppers in greenhouses amounts to 2000 kilos and 1000 kilos respectively, which is in accordance with the expected quantities. The farmers are satisfied with both the production and profit.

The vegetable sorts being presently grown in greenhouses are lettuce, spring onion and spinach, aimed for the local market. As the production of vegetables in greenhouses is in the initial phase, the farmers confront many problems. One of the basic problems is purchase of seeds and seedlings for greenhouses, and special pesticides for greenhouses. Another problem is the impracticalityof installing heating in greenhouses, which makes the use of greenhouses throughout the year unviable.

Truck farming can be very important as a source of income for a big number of households in the municipality. It is significant that vegetable cultivation can be limited to small areas of land and moreover its placement is quite stable.

For all these reasons truck farming should be stimulated by considerable funding. Advisory service is also very important for this business because the producers need to know more and more about growing vegetables in green houses so that they need for professional help is getting bigger every day.

Fruit growing 

The geographical position, its rolling relief with different sloping degree, its altitude (from 200 m to 600 m above sea level), and temperate continental climate make almost perfect conditions for growing a number of types of fruit. So far there hasn't been the organized fruit growing. Fruit seedlings used to be planted mainly in yards, for domestic consumption, and without application of agricultural protection measures. Unfortunately, the orchards cover only 0.4% of farmland.

Animal husbandry 

Traditionally, cattle breeding is the commonest branch of agriculture in this region, especially the production of milk and meat fattening. Regular purchase and paying of the milk as well as governmental subventions to larger production have the positive effects on intensifying of animal husbandry. The average milk production per head is 1814 liters during lactation period, which is little given to the genetic potential of the cows. By education and introduction of new technologies, the annual milk production per head must be increased to at least 2500 liters (the average production in European Community is 3500-4000 L). It has been noticed that the number of profitable specialized farms is increasing, and more and more farmers is giving up having only one cow to produce milk.

There are 3100 heads of cattle (2150 milk cows, 500 neat, and 450 calves). The new situation caused that 'small' farmers gave up producing, which resulted in decrease of the number of livestock, which consequently led to decrease in milk production.

Milk production 

There are 35 lactose freezers which supply Meggle dairy (500 cooperates), 8 lactose freezers supply 'Jezerka' dairy (184 cooperates), and one supplying Prijedor Dairy. Sheep farming is not as nearly developed as it could be, given the existing conditions and demographics. The plan of high sheep farming should be realized as an accompanying branch of animal housing because the sheep is not the biological competition to any species of domestic animals in terms of feeding. Due to their way of feeding, sheep are easily adaptable to steep areas suitable for turning into nomadic pastures. The sheep farming products are meat, milk, wool, and other raw material.

The attainable supporting measures in animal husbandry: influence on the change of agrarian policy in Bosnia-Herzegovina with the aim of assurance of products placement, for crediting farmers for purchasing reproductive cattle, lactose freezers, milking devices, mechanization etc. The aforementioned measures should also be targeted towards encouraging fodder production, giving bonuses for milk production, stimulating the farmers by awarding the largest production, giving subventions for artificial fertilization, organizing advisory service work (through seminars, brochures, informing farmers on new animal husbandry technologies etc.), stimulating export, breeding the sheep sorts suitable for this region, with the reproduction rate of three lambs per two years and high milk and meet production.

By developing and organizing cattle breeding the conditions should be created for building milk processing facilities for both cow and sheep milk, cheese, butter and other milk products, facilities for wool and leather processing, which could be a good precondition for development of craftsmanship and handicraft, e.g. carpet-making.

Subsidies data

Of the total number of farmers who applied for cantonal subventions, the farmers from Bužim participated with 12.82%.

In 2005, 75 applications were submitted to USK Cantonal Employment Bureau for agricultural production crediting. 25 applications were approved (140,000 km in crediting funds and 50,000 km in irreversible funds). These data were obtained from Bužim Employment Bureau. In 2005 only three farmers were included in Stimulating Program for Employment in Agriculture, created by Federal Ministry of Displaced Persons and Refugees. The Program will be continued in 2006. The credits have been approved for purchase of 10 reproductive cows in the amount of 30,085 km. The credits have also been arranged for purchase of cultivators and their accessories (trailers, ploughs, milling machines and croppers), and for 6 reproductive cows, in the total amount of 33,745.50 km.

Apiculture 

Despite the fact that there is a small number of apiculturists in Bužim, apiculture as an agricultural branch could be significant. Apiculture should be given more attention because honey as the main bee product is irreplaceable in nutrition. Besides honey, bee products are considered to be: wax used in chemical and pharmaceutical industry, propolis, royal jelly and bee venom. Honey production is an additional activity of the population by which the family budgets are increased. The approximate production is 12 kilos per beehive, and honey is sold in the local market.

No application has been submitted for subvention for honey production, because for submission of the application, pursuant to the Law on Primary Agricultural Production Support, it was necessary to submit the receipt of purchase or sale together with other necessary receipts.

Bužim municipality and its surrounding has suitable flora influenced by geographical position, favorable climatic and hydrologic conditions, which is all a good starting point for development of apiculture. Given that Bosnia-Herzegovina does not produce sufficient quantities of honey and other bee products, as compared to consumption, as well as other neighboring countries, including EU members, the placement of these products to the market is not questionable. The guidelines for development of apiculture are as follows: to enable selling of bee products both in and out of the country, pursue activities to increase the production of honey, pollen and other bee products.

Mushroom production and wild fruits 

Button mushroom production in the private sector should be given a special attention because it could significantly contribute to employment in the country. A program should be created for this production, and the farmers should be enabled to start production by means of credits.

Bužim municipality forestland (36.35% - 4710.9 hectares) is rich in wild fruits of various kinds; mushrooms, chestnuts, rose hips etc. All these fruits are suitable for export and due to their high market prices it is necessary to pick them in an organized and timely manner, and place them to the market through the network of purchasing companies and with guaranteed prices. This form of production is profitable, especially for the people incapable for investing and who live in the country.

Agricultural unions and associations 

The association 'Farmer – Bužim', which has around 100 members, is registered in Bužim. It is an interest association of farmers who united on account of the realization of their individual and mutual economical and other interests, their affirmation through various forms of education, supply of semi-products, and sale of finished products. In 2006, Association of Apiculturists 'Pčela' (Bee) Bužim was also founded.

The farming society is Trgozad, which owns farmland but neither grows fruit or vegetables nor breeds cattle. In November 2004, several physical persons also founded a farming society.

Enterprises

Entrepreneurship in Bužim represents a branch of economy which has a great influence on economical development of the municipality. The current entrepreneurship activities are organized within several units, which is represented by the following table:

The features in the table show the total number of legal and physical persons registered by the municipal authorities, who produce and offer various services to the people. Of the total number, the number of legal persons is 78 objects with 777 employees; the number of physical persons is 123 with 173 employees. There are 438 employees in non-economic branches. To sum up the aforementioned features, the total number of business objects is 199 with 950 employees, whereas there are 430 employees in non-economic branches, which makes total of 1,388 employed persons in the municipality.

Despite the importance of entrepreneurship for overall economic development in Bužim municipality, this very important segment is not paid necessary attention to, which reflects in the lack of stimulating measures, problems with crediting of financing, the issues of sufficient number of business objects in the local communities, the presence of gray market, and the lack of adequate programs for stimulation of small firms, at the municipal level. As one of the basic goals is development of efficient and open economy, and in order to be fully oriented towards the development of small enterprises, the cantons must have more influence on providing a broad range of programs for development of entrepreneurship, which can be attained by bigger financial investments in economy, stimulation of entrepreneurship development, creation of stimulating conditions and mechanisms for improvement of both small and medium enterprises.

The main problems which the enterprises face with are often electricity failures, and electricity is the main resource for production. The situation with electricity supply would significantly improve by building of 110 kW sub-station. Besides, the entrepreneurs are faced with illegal work and they expect the municipal authorities to begin solving their problems in a prompt and efficient manner.

See also
Una-Sana Canton
Bosanska Krajina

References

External links

Official site

Cities and towns in the Federation of Bosnia and Herzegovina
Populated places in Bužim
Municipalities of the Una-Sana Canton
Populated places with highest incidence of multiple birth